Thiloa glaucocarpa is a species of plant in the Combretaceae family. It is endemic to Brazil and Bolivia.

References

 Souza, Vinicius Castro and Lorenzi, Harri: Systematic Botany - illustrated guide to identification of Angiosperm families of flora, based on APG II. Instituto Plantarum, Nova Odessa SP, 2005. 

Flora of Bolivia
Flora of Brazil
Combretaceae